John Odiri Ogund Omagino, MBChB, MMed, FCOSECSA, is a thoracic and cardiac surgeon in Uganda. He is the executive director of the Uganda Heart Institute (UHI). He is also a member of the board of directors of UHI.

Background and education
He as born in Uganda, circa 1970. After attending Ugandan schools for his elementary and secondary education, he was admitted to Makerere University, where he studied human medicine. In 1985, he graduated from Makerere University School of Medicine, with a Bachelor of Medicine and Bachelor of Surgery (MBChB). He followed that with a Master of Medicine (MMed) degree in Surgery, in 1992. He is also a Fellow of the College of Surgeons of East, Central and Southern Africa (COSECSA). In 1995 he underwent training in Cardio-thoracic Surgery at the International Heart School in Bergamo, Italy.

See also
 Peter Lwabi
 Mulago National Referral Hospital
 Makerere University College of Health Sciences

References

External links
Website of Uganda Ministry of Health
A bad heart condition has caused her body to swell

Living people
1970 births
Ugandan surgeons
People from Northern Region, Uganda
Makerere University alumni
Fellows of the College of Surgeons of East, Central and Southern Africa
Academic staff of Makerere University